Timothy George Butler (born 7 December 1958) is an English musician and songwriter. He is the bass player, and co-founder of the Psychedelic Furs. He is also the youngest of three brothers.

Richard, the eldest, is the lead singer of the Psychedelic Furs. Both brothers were also founding members of the alternative rock band, Love Spit Love.

Butler was born in Teddington, Middlesex, England and lives in Liberty, Kentucky with his wife Robyn Wesley Butler and their children. She was a fan since the Forever Now (1982) album.

References

External links
 The Psychedelic Furs: The Feel Is Everything
 
 

1958 births
Living people
English bass guitarists
English male guitarists
American male bass guitarists
English songwriters
People from Teddington
The Psychedelic Furs members
Love Spit Love members
Musicians from Lexington, Kentucky
Songwriters from Kentucky
Guitarists from Kentucky
20th-century American bass guitarists
20th-century American male musicians
British male songwriters
American male songwriters